Nesterovo is a rural locality (a village) and the administrative center of Nesterovskoye Rural Settlement, Sokolsky District, Vologda Oblast, Russia. The population was 236 as of 2002.

Geography 
Nesterovo is located 32 km north of Sokol (the district's administrative centre) by road. Mikhalevo is the nearest rural locality.

References 

Rural localities in Sokolsky District, Vologda Oblast